The Albatros C.XIII was a German two-seat, single-engine, biplane light fighter aircraft built in 1917. Only one was constructed.

Design and development
The C.XIII was built along the lines of the single seat Albatros D.Va but was a two-seater, larger by about 10% in span and by 6% in length. It was intended to fall into the newer Idflieg two seat CL-class, reserved for lighter two-seat fighters.

The round cross section, plywood-covered fuselage was, apart from the second, tandem open cockpit similar in appearance to that of the D.Va, smoothly tapering to the nose with lines that merged into those of the spinner.  As with the single-seater, the inline Mercedes D.III engine was largely enclosed but had its six upper cylinders exposed.  The C.XIII was fitted with an early  unit, less powerful than the D.Va's. The empennage was noticeably different, with a narrower, taller vertical tail.  Its straight, constant-chord wings had single bays and were mounted without stagger.  The undercarriage was of the fixed type, with mainwheels on V-struts and a faired-in tailskid.

First flown in 1917, only one C.XIII was built and the type did not enter production; instead Albatros built the flat-sided, two-bay, more powerful C.XIV the following year for the light two-seat category, developing it into the production C.XV.

Specifications

See also

References

C.XIII
1910s German fighter aircraft
Aircraft first flown in 1917